Signor, Signore (f. Signora) is an Italian word meaning nobleman.

As a family name it may refer to:
 Tari Signor (born 1967), American actress
 Philip W. Signor, a paleontologist known for Signor–Lipps effect

In the following instances, the word may be intended as a title, or just possibly as a given name
 Signor Brocolini (1841–1906), Irish-born American operatic singer
 Signor Lawanda (1849–1934), American circus performer and strongman

Places:
 Signore, Udaipurwati is a village in Jhunjhunu district of Indian state Rajasthan.

See also
 Signor–Lipps effect
 Signori